Empedocles is a large underwater volcano located 40 km off the  southern coast of Sicily named after the Greek philosopher Empedocles who believed that everything on Earth was made up of the four elements.

According to Italy's National Institute of Geophysics and Volcanology, the volcanic structure is around 400 meters high, with a base 30 km long and 25 km wide. Located in the Campi Flegrei del Mar di Sicilia (Phlegraean Fields of the Strait of Sicily), Empedocles is composed of what was once believed to be separate volcanic centers, including Graham Island (Ferdinandea).

The volcano shows no sign of erupting in the near future. While the volcano's top is now 7 meters below sea level, it was once visible above the water. In 1831 Empedocles broke the surface as Graham Island (Ferdinandea) and almost caused a major international incident when several countries tried to claim ownership of it. It disappeared into the water again five months later.

References

Volcanoes of Italy
Submarine volcanoes
Landforms of Sicily
Seamounts of the Mediterranean